Antoni García "A. G." Porta (born 1954) is a Spanish novelist.

Porta was born in Barcelona in 1954. His first published work a collaboration with Roberto Bolaño entitled Advice from a Morrison Disciple to a Joyce Fanatic (Consejos de un discípulo de Morrison a un fanático de Joyce) in 1984. It won the Premio Ámbito Literario. This was also Bolaño's first published novel. Their collaboration would produce one more work before Porta abandoned literature for fifteen years to work a variety of jobs. In 1999, he published Braudel on Braudel (Braudel por Braudel), marking his work's return to publication. This was followed by The Weight of the Air (El peso del aire) in 2001 and Singapore (Singapur) in 2003.

In 2006, Porta published The No World Concerto (Concierto del No Mundo) which had won the Premio Café Gijón in 2005. In 2008 he published Geography of Time (Geographía del tiempo).

A fictionalized version of Porta appears in Bolaño's posthumously published work Woes of the True Policeman.

Works
In Spanish

 Braudel por Braudel, Acantilado, 1999
 El peso del aire, Acantilado, 2001
 Singapur, Acantilado, 2003
 Concierto del No Mundo, Acantilado, 2006
 Geografía del tiempo, Acantilado, 2008

Collaborations with Bolaño

 Consejos de un discípulo de Morrison a un fanático de Joyce (Anthropos, 1984), novel
 Diario de bar, short story
(Published together in a single volume by Acantilado in 2006)

In English
 The No World Concerto, Dalkey Archive, 2013 (trans. Darren Koolman, Rhett McNeil)

References

External links
 Page at Dalkey Archive
 Brief Bio (in Spanish)
 Interview (in Spanish)
 2014 Bomb Magazine interview of A.G. Porta by Margaret Hooks

1954 births
Living people
20th-century Spanish novelists
Spanish male novelists
Writers from Barcelona
21st-century Spanish novelists
20th-century Spanish male writers
21st-century Spanish male writers